The 2011 Canadian National Women's Under-18 Championships in ice hockey were held in Saguenay, Quebec.  All games were contested at the Centre Georges-Vézina. Team Ontario Red claimed their sixth gold medal. Team Manitoba claimed their third bronze medal in tournament history.

Medal round
The gold medal game signified the sixth time in seven tournaments in which Ontario Red and Quebec played each other. In every match, Team Ontario Red triumphed (2001, January 2005, November 2005, 2007, 2008, 2011). At sixty-three seconds into the first period, Jaimie McDonell scored the game-winning goal on Ann-Renée Desbiens. With the win, Ontario Red improved its all-time record at the tournament to 35-1.

Bronze medal game

Gold medal game

Scoring leaders

Awards and honors
Most Valuable Player: Jaimie McDonell, Ontario Red
Top Forward: Shannon MacAulay, Team Atlantic
Top Defenceman: Cydney Roesler, Ontario Red
Top Goaltender: Amanda Leveille, Ontario Red
Most Sportsmanlike Player: Cayley Mercer, Ontario Red

Players of the Game
Bronze Medal Game: Danielle Krzyszczyk (Manitoba)
Bronze Medal Game: Taylor Dale (Team Atlantic)
Gold Medal Game: Amanda Leveille (Team Ontario Red)
Gold Medal Game: Laurie Mercier (Quebec)

References

Under